Abdella may refer to:

Ali Said Abdella, (1949–2005), an Eritrean military and governmental official
Abdella (died 345), a priest and fellow martyr of Shemon Bar Sabbae